Hai-Hsin Huang (born 1984) is a Brooklyn-based Taiwanese artist. She works primarily in painting, drawing, and with publications.

Career 
Huang received her BA degree from National Taipei University of Education in 2007 and an MFA from The School of Visual Arts in New York in 2009. Often employing humor and horror in her paintings, Huang explores the chaos to be found in everyday life scenes. She also uses her work to reflect on her cross-cultural experiences and encounters with racism as a foreigner living in the United States.

Her painting series A Museum Show (2016-2017), was formed by her time spent visiting museums in New York, particularly The Met, in search of inspiration and is inspired by her on observations of the tourists, school groups, and other museum-goers.

She has also collaborated on several artist book projects with the Taiwanese independent publishers nos:books, designing and publishing books together from 2014-2019.

See also
Taiwanese art

References 

Artists from Taipei
Artists from Brooklyn
Taiwanese painters
American women painters
National Taipei University of Education alumni
School of Visual Arts alumni
1984 births
Living people
Taiwanese women painters
21st-century American women